Fred Rivara (born May 17, 1949) is a professor of pediatrics and epidemiology at the University of Washington at Seattle Children's Hospital known for his research into the relationship between gun ownership and gun violence in the 1990s. Rivara has also researched bicycle helmets, intimate partner violence, and alcohol abuse, among other topics.

Education
Rivara earned his doctor of medicine in 1974 from the University of Pennsylvania. In 1980, he completed a master's in public health at the University of Washington.

Career
Rivara's career spans 30 years. His research has covered topics such as alcohol abuse and domestic violence, and he has been a vocal advocate for the use of bicycle helmets to reduce injury. Rivara says that his work has helped to drastically reduce the number of children who are injured while riding bikes. He founded the Harborview Injury and Research Center in Seattle and the International Society for Child and Adolescent Injury Prevention. At the University of Washington, Rivara is vice chair of the Department of Pediatrics in the School of Medicine and chief of the Division of General Pediatrics and. Rivara is also editor-in-chief of the journal JAMA Pediatrics.

Gun violence research
In the 1990s, Rivara received funding from the Centers for Disease Control and Prevention to research the relationship between gun ownership and gun violence. His research found that the chances of homicide or suicide increase threefold when there is a gun present in a home, while the risk of suicide for teens increases as much as tenfold. Rivara and his colleagues published their research in the New England Journal of Medicine in 1993 in a series of articles on their findings.

“[Our research] underwent peer review and was thought to be very solid and worthwhile research,” Rivara told PRI program The Takeaway in a 2015 interview. “The CDC stood by our research—they had funded it and they stood by it. Unfortunately, it raised the attention of the National Rifle Association, who then worked with pro-gun members of Congress to essentially stop funding firearm research.”

The NRA then lobbied Congress, saying that since guns aren't a disease, CDC funds should not be allocated to them. A bill passed that prevented the CDC from setting aside funds for gun research.

Awards
Some awards Rivara has received include:
Charles C. Shepard Science Award from the Centers for Disease Control and Prevention 
Injury Control and Emergency Health Services Section Distinguished Career Award 
American Academy of Pediatrics, Section on Injury and Poison Prevention, Physician Achievement Award
UW School of Public Health Distinguished Alumni Award

References 

American pediatricians
Perelman School of Medicine at the University of Pennsylvania alumni
University of Washington School of Public Health alumni
University of Washington faculty
Living people
Gun violence researchers
1949 births
Members of the National Academy of Medicine